Powa may refer to:

 Phowa, a Buddhist meditation practice
 Powa Technologies, a technology company
 POWA, People Opposing Women Abuse, South African NGO
 "P.O.W.A.", 2017 song by M.I.A.
 "P.O.W.A.", Playful, Origin, Wrongless Approach, by Powa Academy